Vachiravit Paisarnkulwong (born 31 August 1996), better known by his nickname August, is a Thai actor and model. He is best known for his first leading role as Pete in the Thai BL drama Love Sick: The Series (2014), which propelled him to fame in Thailand.

Early life and education
Vachiravit was born on August 31, 1996 in Bangkok, Thailand. He graduated from Department of Sports Science and Sports Development, Faculty of Allied Health Sciences at the Thammasat University.

Career
In 2021, August co-starred with Namfah Thunyapht Phathirathiracharoen in Thailand romantic comedy series "My mischievous Fiancee “  （แม่ครัวคนใหม่ / Mae Krua/New Cook/萌新小廚娘 / 新搞怪女廚 receiving the high ratings in Thailand, Indonesia, Cambodia  China ..It is about the psychologist(August)and disguised fiancée（Namfah）from against their arranged marriage to fall in love with each other. August and Namfah are being acclaimed as the year of popular image couples and new stars in Thailand. Thailand and international viewerships eager to their next co-starring TV drama soon.

In 2014, he made his acting debut in the television series Love Sick: The Series, playing the role of Pete. August was one amongst thousands of contestants who auditioned for the series.

Filmography

Films

Television series

Concert
 Channel 3 Super Fan Live!: SUPERNOVA Universe Explosion Concert

Discography

Soundtrack appearances

Awards and nominations

References

External links
 
 

1996 births
Living people
Vachiravit Paisarnkulwong
Vachiravit Paisarnkulwong
Vachiravit Paisarnkulwong
Vachiravit Paisarnkulwong
Vachiravit Paisarnkulwong
Vachiravit Paisarnkulwong
Vachiravit Paisarnkulwong
Vachiravit Paisarnkulwong